John Charles O'Connor (December 1, 1891 – May 30, 1982) was an Irish born Major League Baseball player. Nicknamed "Bucky", he played one game at catcher for the Chicago Cubs on September 16, 1916. O'Connor replaced the Cubs' Rowdy Elliott after he "split" his finger on a foul tip. The Cubs' other catchers, Jimmy Archer and Art Wilson, were themselves injured. O'Connor caught one inning until Wilson, who had been sitting in the grandstand, then "limped" to the Cubs' clubhouse to put on his uniform, replaced O'Connor and finished the game.

References

Sources

Major League Baseball catchers
Chicago Cubs players
Major League Baseball players from Ireland
Irish baseball players
1891 births
1982 deaths
People from County Kerry
People from Bonner Springs, Kansas
Irish emigrants to the United States (before 1923)
Baseball players from Kansas